Looking Up is a compilation album by British R&B singer Michelle Gayle, released in 2000.

Track listing
"Looking Up" – 4.33 from Michelle Gayle
"Girlfriend" – 4.10 from Michelle Gayle
"Sweetness (Radio Edit)" – 3.38 from Michelle Gayle
"Fly Away" – 3.41 from ''Sensational
"Your Love" – 5.10 from Michelle Gayle
"Talk It Over" – 4.46 from Sensational
"Do You Know (Radio Edit)" – 3.36 from Sensational
"One Day" – 3.45 from Michelle Gayle
"Sensational (Radio Edit)" – 3.08 from Sensational
"Say What's on Your Mind" – 3.34 from Michelle Gayle
"Freedom" – 4.06 from Michelle Gayle
"Get Off My Back" – 4.09 from Michelle Gayle
"Personality" – 3.49 from Michelle Gayle
"All Night Long" – 4.42 from Michelle Gayle
"Baby Don't Go" – 5.03 from Michelle Gayle
"Happy Just To Be With You (Nigel Lowis Mix)" – 3.51 from Sensational

Michelle Gayle albums
2000 compilation albums